Las Palmas, most commonly refers to Las Palmas de Gran Canaria, a city in the Canary Islands, Spain.

Las Palmas may also refer to:

Spain 
 Province of Las Palmas, a province with the capital city of Las Palmas
 UD Las Palmas, a football team based in Las Palmas
 CV Las Palmas, a volleyball team based in Las Palmas
 Port of Las Palmas (Puerto de Las Palmas), an international sea port based in Las Palmas
 Gran Canaria Airport (Las Palmas Airport), an international airport based in near Las Palmas
 University of Las Palmas de Gran Canaria, a university located in Las Palmas
 Battle of Las Palmas, in 1595 during the Anglo-Spanish War
 Carnival of Las Palmas, a carnival which takes place in Las Palmas
 Las Palmas de Gran Canaria International Film Festival, an international film festival which takes place in Las Palmas
 Las Palmas (Spanish Congress Electoral District)

Other

Argentina
 Las Palmas, Argentina, a rocket launching site
 Las Palmas, Chaco, a village and municipality in Chaco Province

Ecuador
 Las Palmas, a beach in Esmeraldas, Ecuador

Mexico
 Las Palmas complex, an archaeological pattern
 Las Palmas River

Panama
 Las Palmas District
 Las Palmas, Los Santos
 Las Palmas, Veraguas

Peru
 Las Palmas Air Base, an airport in Lima
 Las Palmas, a beach in the Asia District, Cañete Province

United States
 Las Palmas, Fresno, California, neighborhood
 Las Palmas (Santurce), subbarrio of Santurce barrio in San Juan, Puerto Rico
 Las Palmas, Utuado, Puerto Rico, a barrio of Utuado, Puerto Rico
 Las Palmas, Texas, census-designated place in Zapata County
 Las Palmas-Juarez, Texas, a former census-designated place in Cameron County
 Las Palmas II, Texas, current census-designated place in Cameron County
 Las Palmas Handicap, a horse race in Inglewood, California

Antarctica
 Las Palmas Cove
 Las Palmas Glacier

Sports teams
 Las Palmas de Gran Canaria
 UD Las Palmas, football team 
 UD Las Palmas Atlético, reserve team of the above
 Universidad de Las Palmas CF, football team 
 Universidad de Las Palmas CF B, reserve team of the above
 CV Las Palmas, volleyball team
 CH Las Palmas, ice hockey team
 Club Atlético Las Palmas, Argentine football team

See also 
 La Palma, one of islands of Canary Islands, Spain
 Palma (disambiguation)
 Palmas (disambiguation)
 Isla de Las Palomas